The 2017 Rogers Cup presented by National Bank was a tennis tournament to be played on outdoor hard courts. It was the 128th edition (for the men) and the 125th (for the women) of the Canadian Open. The tournament was part of the ATP World Tour Masters 1000 of the 2017 ATP World Tour, and of the WTA Premier 5 tournaments of the 2017 WTA Tour, and is also a 2017 US Open Series event. The women's event (also called the Toronto Open) was held at the Aviva Centre in Toronto, from August 7 to August 13 and the men's event was held at the Uniprix Stadium in Montreal, from August 7 to August 13.

Points and prize money

Point distribution

Prize money

ATP singles main-draw entrants

Seeds
The following are the seeded players. Seedings are based on ATP rankings as of July 31, 2017. Rankings and points before are as of August 7, 2017.

Because the tournament takes place two weeks later than in 2016, the points defended from last year was not superseded within a 52-week run, the results during the 52-week period were from 2016 Los Cabos Open.

† The player used an exemption to skip the tournament in 2016. Accordingly, points for his 18th best result are deducted instead.

Other entrants
The following players received wild cards into the main singles draw:
  Peter Polansky
  Vasek Pospisil
  Brayden Schnur
  Denis Shapovalov

The following players received entry from the singles qualifying draw:
  Thomas Fabbiano
  Norbert Gombos
  Pierre-Hugues Herbert
  Vincent Millot
  Reilly Opelka
  Dudi Sela
  Tim Smyczek

The following players received entry as lucky losers:
  Ernesto Escobedo
  Mikhail Youzhny

Withdrawals
Before the tournament
  Tomáš Berdych (rib) →replaced by  Ernesto Escobedo
  Marin Čilić (adductor injury) →replaced by  Daniil Medvedev
  Pablo Cuevas →replaced by  Adrian Mannarino
  Novak Djokovic (elbow injury) →replaced by  Kevin Anderson
  Fabio Fognini →replaced by  Chung Hyeon
  Ivo Karlović →replaced by  Frances Tiafoe
  Martin Kližan →replaced by  Donald Young
  Gilles Müller →replaced by  Mikhail Youzhny
  Andy Murray (hip injury) →replaced by  Yūichi Sugita
  Gilles Simon →replaced by  Nikoloz Basilashvili
  Fernando Verdasco →replaced by  Jared Donaldson
  Stan Wawrinka (knee injury) →replaced by  Kyle Edmund

ATP doubles main-draw entrants

Seeds

 Rankings are as of July 31, 2017

Other entrants
The following pairs received wildcards into the doubles main draw:
  Frank Dancevic /  Adil Shamasdin
  Daniel Nestor /  Vasek Pospisil

The following pair received entry as alternates:
  Gaël Monfils /  Benoît Paire

Withdrawals
Before the tournament
  Steve Johnson

During the tournament
  David Ferrer

WTA singles main-draw entrants

Seeds

 1 Rankings are as of July 31, 2017

Other entrants
The following players received wild cards into the main singles draw:
  Françoise Abanda
  Bianca Andreescu
  Eugenie Bouchard

The following player received entry using a protected ranking:
  Sloane Stephens

The following players received entry from the singles qualifying draw:
  Ekaterina Alexandrova
  Lara Arruabarrena
  Ashleigh Barty
  Irina-Camelia Begu
  Sorana Cîrstea
  Mariana Duque Mariño
  Kirsten Flipkens
  Varvara Lepchenko
  Naomi Osaka
  Donna Vekić
  Sachia Vickery
  Heather Watson

The following player received entry as a lucky loser:
  Magdaléna Rybáriková

Withdrawals
Before the tournament
  Madison Keys →replaced by  Magdaléna Rybáriková
  Kristýna Plíšková →replaced by  Julia Görges
  Samantha Stosur →replaced by  Alison Riske

Retirements
  Naomi Osaka

WTA doubles main-draw entrants

Seeds

 Rankings are as of July 31, 2017

Other entrants
The following pairs received wildcards into the doubles main draw:
  Bianca Andreescu /  Carson Branstine
  Eugenie Bouchard /  Karolína Plíšková
  Charlotte Robillard-Millette /  Carol Zhao

The following pair received entry as alternates:
  Lauren Davis /  Alison Riske

Withdrawals
Before the tournament
  Ana Konjuh

During the tournament
  Peng Shuai

Finals

Men's singles

  Alexander Zverev defeated  Roger Federer, 6–3, 6–4

Women's singles

  Elina Svitolina defeated  Caroline Wozniacki, 6–4, 6–0

Men's doubles

  Pierre-Hugues Herbert /  Nicolas Mahut defeated  Rohan Bopanna /  Ivan Dodig, 6–4, 3–6, [10–6]

Women's doubles

  Ekaterina Makarova /  Elena Vesnina defeated  Anna-Lena Grönefeld /  Květa Peschke, 6–0, 6-4

References

External links
Official website - Men's tournament
Official website - Women's tournament

 
2017 ATP World Tour
2017 WTA Tour
2017 in Canadian tennis
2017
August 2017 sports events in Canada